Kartoffelkäse or in Austria usually Erdäpfelkäse (literally: potato cheese) is a spread from the regions of Bavaria and Austria. Its ingredients include potatoes, onions and sour cream.

Origin
The name confuses as the spread does not contain any cheese (see also Leberkäse). The name is considered to derive from the milky-sweet flavour.

The spread was originally a dish that was prepared for the seasonal workers that helped with the potato harvest and was served as second breakfast or snack with milk, beer and must. It is very popular in Lower Bavaria, Inner and Western Austria and is made from floury potatoes, sour cream, cream and onions.

Preparation
The potatoes are cooked and mashed and mixed with small diced onion (in proportions 3:1) and sour cream until it becomes a spreadable mixture. This is then flavoured with salt, pepper, caraway, chives and sometimes garlic, parsley.
Some recipes suggest to mix a cooked egg but this shortens the storage life considerably.

The essentials in brief: Boil the potatoes. Mash while still hot. Add finely chopped onion, sour cream, chives and season to taste.

See also
 Austrian cuisine
 Bavarian cuisine
 Brenntar
 List of spreads
 Obatzda

References 

Bavarian cuisine
Austrian cuisine
Spreads (food)
Potato dishes